NMS Regele Ferdinand was the lead ship of her class of two destroyers built in Italy for the Romanian Navy in the late 1920s. After the Axis invasion of the Soviet Union on 22 June 1941 (Operation Barbarossa), she was limited to escort duties in the western half of the Black Sea during the war by the powerful Soviet Black Sea Fleet which heavily outnumbered Axis naval forces in the Black Sea. The ship may have sunk two Soviet submarines during the war. In early 1944 the Soviets were able to cut off and surround the port of Sevastopol on the Crimean Peninsula. Regele Ferdinand covered convoys evacuating Axis troops from Sevastopol and was badly damaged in May when she rescued some troops herself.

Later that year Romania switched sides, but despite that the Soviets seized the Romanian ships and incorporated them into the Soviet Navy. Renamed Likhoy, the ship served until she was struck from the navy list in 1951 when she was returned to the Romanians who renamed her D21 in 1952. The ship was discarded in 1961 and subsequently scrapped.

Background and design
Following the end of World War I and the re-purchase of two Aquila-class cruisers from Italy, the Romanian Government decided to order also two modern destroyers from the Pattison Yard in Italy, as part of the 1927 Naval Programme. The design was based on the British Shakespeare-class destroyer leaders, but differed in the arrangement of their propulsion machinery. The guns were imported from Sweden and the fire-control system from Germany. Four destroyers were intended to be ordered, but only two were actually built.

Their crew numbered 212 officers and sailors. The ships were powered by two Parsons geared steam turbines, each driving a single propeller, using steam provided by four Thornycroft boilers.

The main armament of the Regele Ferdinand-class ships consisted of five 50-calibre Bofors  guns in single mounts, two superfiring pairs fore and aft of the superstructure and one gun aft of the rear funnel. For anti-aircraft defense, they were equipped with one Bofors  anti-aircraft (AA) gun between the funnels and a pair of  AA guns. The ships were fitted with two triple mounts for  torpedo tubes and could carry 50 mines and 40 depth charges.  They were equipped with a Siemens fire-control system which included a pair of rangefinders, one each for the fore and aft guns.

Modifications
The 40-millimetre guns were replaced by two German  AA guns and a pair of French  M1929 Hotchkiss machineguns were added in 1939. Two Italian depth charge throwers were later installed. During World War II, the 76-millimetre gun was replaced by four  AA guns. In 1943, the two ships were equipped with a German S-Gerät sonar. The following year, the upper forward 120-millimetre gun was replaced by a German  AA gun. German 88-millimetre guns in Romanian service were themselves modified by being fitted with Romanian-produced barrel liners.

Construction and career
Regele Ferdinand, named after King Ferdinand I of Romania, was ordered on 13 November 1926 and was laid down by Pattison in June 1927 at their shipyard in Naples, Italy. She was launched on 2 December 1928 and commissioned on 7 September 1930 after arriving in Romania. The ship was assigned to the Destroyer Squadron, which was visited by King Carol II of Romania and the Prime Minister, Nicolae Iorga, on 27 May 1931.

Massively outnumbered by the Black Sea Fleet, the Romanian ships were kept behind the minefields defending Constanța for several months after the start of Operation Barbarossa on 22 June 1941, training for convoy escort operations. Beginning on 5 October, the Romanians began laying minefields to defend the route between the Bosphorus and Constanța; the minelayers were protected by the destroyers. After the evacuation of Odessa on 16 October, they began to clear the Soviet mines defending the port and to lay their own minefields protecting the route between Constanța and Odessa. On 1 December Regele Ferdinand, her sister ship  and the flotilla leader Mărăști were escorting a convoy to Odessa when a submarine unsuccessfully attacked the convoy. It was quickly spotted and depth charged by Regele Ferdinand and Regina Maria with the latter claiming a kill. Soviet records do not acknowledge any losses on that date. The sisters escorted another convoy to Odessa on 16–17 December, the last one before ice closed the port. As the convoy passed Jibrieni, Regele Ferdinand spotted a submarine's periscope and depth charged the submarine after evading a pair of torpedoes. The ship reported spotting debris and an oil slick; she may have sunk .

During the winter of 1941–1942, the Romanian destroyers were primarily occupied with escorting convoys between the Bosporus and Constanța. On the nights of 22/23 and 24/25 June, Regele Ferdinand, Regina Maria and the flotilla leader  covered the laying of defensive minefields off Odessa. After Sevastopol surrendered on 4 July, a direct route between the port and Constanța was opened in October and operated year-round. On 14 October Regele Ferdinand was attacked and missed by the submarine . The submarine  unsuccessfully attacked Regele Ferdinand and Mărăști as they escorted a convoy of two Italian oil tankers off the Bosporus; they depth charged the submarine, but she survived. On 14 November the German  oil tanker  was torpedoed at the entrance to the Bosporus by the submarine  as she was being met by the sisters.

Regele Ferdinand and Mărășești escorted the minelayer  as she laid a minefield off the approaches to Sevastopol harbor on the night of 13/14 September 1943. Two days later Regele Ferdinand attacked a submarine, possibly Shch-207, and claimed to have sunk it. Soviet sources do not acknowledge any submarine lost on that day. The submarine  made an unsuccessful attack off Yevpatoria on a ship escorted by Regele Ferdinand on the early morning of 22 September. On the night of 9/10 November, the sisters escorted minelayers as they laid a minefield off Sevastopol. The minefield was enlarged between 14 and 16 November as Regele Ferdinand and Mărășești covered the minelayers.

Successful Soviet attacks in early 1944 cut the overland connection of the Crimea with the rest of Ukraine and necessitated its supply by sea. In early April another offensive occupied most of the peninsula and encircled Sevastopol. The Romanians began evacuating the city on 14 April, with their destroyers covering the troop convoys. Shortly after the latter submarine missed with her pair of torpedoes, the freighter was bombed and set on fire by Soviet aircraft. Other ships rescued her passengers and crew after they abandoned ship, but the sisters were dispatched to see if she could be salvaged. They put a skeleton crew aboard to operate her pumps and to stabilise her before a pair of tugboats arrived the next morning to tow her to Constanța.

Adolf Hitler suspended the evacuation on 27 April, but relented on 8 May after further Soviet attacks further endangered the Axis forces in Sevastopol as they closed within artillery range of the harbour. Regele Ferdinand arrived at Sevastopol harbour during the early morning of 11 May and loaded troops before departing later that morning. Soviet air attacks began at 06:00 and lasted until 10:30. The exposed troops and her AA gunners suffered the most from strafing of her decks by aircraft and bomb splinters, but one bomb struck the bridge and killed two officers. Other hits started small fires, but the biggest problem was an unexploded bomb that pierced the port oil tank, causing a major leak. At 09:30 she was engaged by Soviet coastal artillery, but suppressed them with her counter fire. About an hour later, her captain radioed for help, shortly before the final attacks destroyed her radio room and damaged her starboard fuel lines; despite passing oil hand-to-hand in a bucket brigade, the ship ran out of fuel early the following morning and had to be towed a short distance to Constanța. Regele Ferdinand was damaged during a Soviet airstrike on Constanța on 20 August with 47 men killed.

After King Michael's Coup on 23 August, Romania declared war on the Axis Powers. Regele Ferdinand remained in harbour until she was seized by the Soviets on 5 September together with the rest of the Romanian Navy. Before being renamed Likhoy on 20 October, the ship was commissioned into the Soviet Navy on 14 September as part of the Black Sea Fleet, along with her sister. She was struck from the navy list on 3 July 1951 after she had been returned to Romania with her sister on 24 June. The sisters rejoined Mărăști and Mărășești when they were assigned to the Destroyer Squadron upon their return. Regele Ferdinand was renamed D21 when the Romanian destroyers were assigned numbers when the Destroyer Division was redesignated as the 418th Destroyer Division in 1952. The ship continued to serve until April 1961, when she was discarded and subsequently scrapped.

Notes

Citations

Bibliography
 
 

 
 
 

 

Regele Ferdinand-class destroyers
1928 ships
Ships built in Italy